Hesydrus is a genus of spiders in the family Trechaleidae. It was first described in 1898 by Simon. , it contains 7 Central and South American species.

Species
Hesydrus comprises the following species:
Hesydrus aurantius (Mello-Leitão, 1942)
Hesydrus canar Carico, 2005
Hesydrus caripito Carico, 2005
Hesydrus chanchamayo Carico, 2005
Hesydrus habilis (O. Pickard-Cambridge, 1896)
Hesydrus palustris Simon, 1898
Hesydrus yacuiba Carico, 2005

References

Trechaleidae
Araneomorphae genera
Spiders of Central America
Spiders of South America